Sandra Kviat became the first female rabbi from Denmark in 2011; she was ordained in England at Leo Baeck College. She is now a rabbi for Crouch End havurah in London. She has also been hired to advise on educational and other issues for the Liberal Judaism head office.

See also
Timeline of women rabbis

References

Living people
Danish rabbis
Reform women rabbis
Year of birth missing (living people)
Alumni of Leo Baeck College
British Reform rabbis